Francis Boggs Snavely (April 19, 1897 – October 29, 1979) was an American football and basketball coach.  He served as the head football coach at the New York State College for Teachers at Albany—now known as University at Albany, SUNY—from 1922 to 1924, compiling a record of 1–12–3.
Snavely was also the school's head basketball coach from 1920 to 1924, tallying a mark of 7–31.

Head coaching record

Football

References

1897 births
1979 deaths
Albany Great Danes football coaches
Albany Great Danes men's basketball coaches
Basketball coaches from Nebraska
People from North Platte, Nebraska